Oman–Philippines relations refers to the bilateral relations between Oman and the Philippines. Diplomatic relations between Oman and the Philippines were established on October 6, 1980. The Philippine embassy in Riyadh covered Oman until March 1992 when the Philippines established a resident embassy in Muscat. Oman's embassy in Kuala Lumpur covered the Philippines until the opening of the Omani embassy in Manila in July 2013.

Filipinos in Oman

In the 2011 list of countries considered safe for Overseas Filipino Workers (OFW) by Philippine Overseas Employment Administration (POEA), Oman was the only Middle Eastern country on the list As of 2013, there are about 40,000 Filipinos working in Oman. In 2012 according to POEA, the number of OFW's deployed to Oman amounted to 15,868, 10,291 rehires and 5,577 new hires.

References

Philippines
Bilateral relations of the Philippines
Oman–Philippines relations